Sharon Wardle (born 1964/5) is a British diplomat. She was the Ambassador to The Gambia from 2017. After the negotiations were complete to allow the Gambia to rejoin the commonweath she became the High Commissioner to The Gambia from 2018 to 2020. In 2021 she became the Ambassador to Algeria.

Career

Wardle became a diplomat when she joined the Foreign, Commonwealth & Development Office in 1985.

She was the Ambassador to The Gambia from 2017, taking over from Colin Crorkin. She became ambassador at a time when the Gambia had left the Commonwealth. At her first meeting with the President she assured him that the UK was keen for the Gambia's application to rejoin to proceed.

In January 2020, she was acting on behalf of the Queen giving the Order of the British Empire as a result the 2019 Special Honours. She awarded an OBE to Fatou Baldeh in recognition of her valuable efforts regarding advocating to ethnic communities in Scotland and a KBE to Professor Tumani Corrah.

She was succeeded as the British ambassador in the Gambia by David Belgrove in August 2020.

In 2021, she became the Ambassador to Algeria. She took over from Barry Lowen. Lowen became the ambassador in Mali. She noted that it had been a difficult three years for the country but that she was optimistic concerning Gambia's future.

Wardle was noted for stating the UK's support for the international recognition of  the emerging country of Western Sahara in 2022. Wardle's views on Algeria are reported in the local press. One report of a trip she made to Batna noted her liking for the local stew and flatbread Chakhchoukha and the Roman city and World Heritage Site of Timgad.

Notes

References

1960s births
Living people
Members of HM Diplomatic Service
Ambassadors and High Commissioners of the United Kingdom to the Gambia
Ambassadors of the United Kingdom to Algeria
20th-century British diplomats
21st-century British diplomats